Homelessness in Finland affected 4396 people at the end of 2021. Long-term homelessness affected 1318 people.

Finland is the only European Union country where homelessness is currently falling. The country has adopted a Housing First policy, whereby social services assign homeless individuals rental homes first, and issues like mental health and substance abuse are treated second. Since its launch in 2008, the number of homeless people in Finland has decreased by roughly 30%, and the number of long-term homeless people has fallen by more than 35%. "Sleeping rough", the practice of sleeping outside, has been largely eradicated in Helsinki, where only one 50-bed night shelter remains. 

The Constitution of Finland mandates that public authorities "promote the right of everyone to housing". In addition, the constitution grants Finnish citizens "the right to receive indispensable subsistence and care", if needed.

Since 2002, the Night of the Homeless event has been hosted throughout the country. The events include demonstrations, food distribution, and movie screenings, among other activities.

A "night café" in Helsinki, Kalkkers (run by the non-governmental organisation Vailla vakinaista asuntoa ry), operates as a temporary overnight resting place for approximately 15 people each night. Here showers, a meal and place to be with no questions asked is provided.

Statistics
Since 1987, the Housing Finance and Development Centre of Finland (ARA) has been publishing annual statistics related to homelessness. The figures are collected independently by the municipalities of Finland, leading to minor inconsistencies in reporting. ARA publishes data on homeless families and homeless people living alone separately.

The majority of homeless people reside in larger cities, notably in the capital region. Over 60 percent of Finland's homeless population resides in the Greater Helsinki area. Homelessness disproportionately affects men, although this gap has been reduced due to recent efforts. Roughly three out of four homeless individuals are male.

Some key figures for homeless people in Finland (2019) include the following:
 21% of the homeless are considered long-term homeless
 26% of the homeless are female
 18% of the homeless are young (under 25 years old)
 24% of the homeless are immigrants

Notes

References

Finland
Housing in Finland